Labdia emphanopa is a moth in the family Cosmopterigidae. It was described by Edward Meyrick in 1922. It is known from India.

References

Labdia
Moths described in 1922